Maria Kusche (Malaga, 1928–2012) was a Spanish art historian of German descent, a specialist on painters at the royal court of Philip II of Spain, in particular Sofonisba Anguissola, Juan Pantoja de la Cruz, and Alonso Sánchez Coello.

Biography
Maria Kusche was born in 1928 of German parents who had emigrated and met in Malaga. Her father, Ernesto (born Ernst) Kusche (1878-1965), was a business leader and co-founder of Baquera, Kusche & Martin S.A. (Bakumar) which at one point was viewed as the biggest terrestrial and maritime transport and customs company in Spain. A street near Málaga Airport still bears his name. Her mother, born Elisabeth Strandes (1892-1967), was a daughter of merchant and Hamburg Senator .

In 1963 she married Winfried Zettelmeyer, a development economist, and subsequently followed him to live in various African and Latin American countries. They had two sons, Jeromin (born 1964) and Florian (born 1968), who both also became social science scholars.

Research
Kusche was a leading scholar on Sofonisba Anguissola, a prominent woman artist of the 16th century.

Kusche successfully questioned the traditional attribution to El Greco of the Lady in a Fur Wrap, an iconic portrait formerly at Louis Philippe I's Spanish gallery at the Louvre and held since 1853 at Pollok House in Glasgow. A later radiography analysis confirmed her stylistic arguments against El Greco's authorship, even though its authors opted to attribute the painting to Alonso Sánchez Coello.

Selected works
 Wo die Maultiertreiber singen. Eine Familiengeschichte aus Andalusien, Recklinghausen: Georg Bitter Verlag, 1987, 
 Sofonisba Anguissola: A Renaissance Woman (with Sylvia Ferino-Pagden), Washington DC: National Museum of Women in the Arts, 1995, 
 Retratos y retratadores : Alonso Sánchez Coello y sus competidores Sofonisba Anguissola, Jorge de la Rúa y Rolán Moys, Madrid: Fundación de Apoyo a la Historia del arte Hispánico, 2003, 
 Juan Pantoja de La Cruz y sus seguidores. Bartolomé González, Rodrigo de Villandrando y Antonio López Polanco, Madrid: Fundación de Apoyo a la Historia del Arte Hispánico, 2007, 
 Preface of Hora temprana. Poemas y cartas, a collection of poems by Sol Acín (edited by Ismael Gracia), Zaragoza: Prensas de la Universidad de Zaragoza, 2014, . Maria Kusche was Acín's lifelong friend and correspondent.

Notes

People from Málaga
Women art historians
Spanish art historians
1928 births
2012 deaths